Foula, located in the Shetland archipelago of Scotland, is one of the United Kingdom’s most remote permanently inhabited islands. Owned since the turn of the 20th century by the Holbourn family, the island was the location for the film The Edge of the World (1937). The liner RMS Oceanic was wrecked on the nearby Shaalds of Foula in 1914.

Toponym
The name "Foula" derives from Old Norse Fugley, "bird island": compare the Faroese name of the island of Fugloy, "bird island", and Scottish Gaelic Fughlaigh.

Geography
It was part of Walls civil parish. It rises from low broken cliffs in the east to precipitous  cliffs in the west. At the north end is Gaada Stack, a natural arch and towards the south-west is Da Sneck Ida Smaalie, a spectacular 30 m deep and 2 m wide crack in the cliffs. Foula lies on the same latitude as Saint Petersburg.

Foula has a population of 38 people, living in Hametun and Ham. Islanders previously made a living from fishing – first for whitefish, then lobster. Today, most islanders are crofters with income from sheep farming and birdwatching tourism.

Tides here can reach , and as the reef comes to within less than a metre of the surface, it poses a significant threat to shipping.

Transport

BK Marine Limited operates the ferry service from Ham to Walls on the Shetland mainland. New Advance carries up to 12 passengers and completes the voyage in about two hours. Flights take off from Foula Airfield to Tingwall Airport. A ferry service ran from Foula to Scalloway until 2010.

There is little shelter for boats in the island. The only beach is at the head of Ham Voe on the east coast. Local boats, including the mail boat, are hauled out of the water.

Wildlife

The island's  cliffs are home to numerous birds, including Arctic terns, red-throated divers and great skuas, and birders make up the bulk of visitors to the island.

History

Prehistory
Foula was first inhabited as far back as 5,000 years ago. Between 2006 and 2008, the Bath & Camerton Archeological Society took several trips to Foula to study prehistoric standing stones. A particular sub-circular stone circle of interest was discovered in 2006 at Da Heights in the north of Foula.  A further investigation launched in 2007 revealed that the sub-circular stone construction was man-made, elliptical in shape with the axis pointing towards the mid-winter solstice, built before 1000 BC.

15th to 19th centuries
In 1490, the Ciske family's estates were divided and Vaila and Foula became the property of Alv Knutsson. However, the Ciskes were Norwegian, and as Scotland had annexed Shetland a few decades before, there were confusing and conflicting claims of ownership.

In 1720, a smallpox epidemic struck the two hundred people living on Foula. Because the islanders were so isolated from the rest of the world, they had no immunity to smallpox, unlike most North European peoples at that time, and nine out of ten of the island's population died in the epidemic.

Foula remained on the Julian calendar when the rest of the Kingdom of Great Britain adopted the Gregorian calendar in 1752. Foula adhered to the Julian calendar by keeping 1800 as a leap year, but it did not observe a leap year in 1900. As a result, Foula is now one day ahead of the Julian calendar and 12 days behind the Gregorian, observing Christmas Day on 6 January Gregorian and New Year on 13 January Gregorian.

The writer and journalist John Sands lived on Foula and Papa Stour for a while during the late 19th century. He fought hard against the prevailing truck system and drew political cartoons lampooning its deficiencies. In one, he drew Foula as a beautiful young woman being strangled by a boa-constrictor labelled 'landlordism' watched by other reptiles called 'missionary', 'laird' and 'truck'.

The island was one of the last places where the Norn language was spoken (although it is claimed that Walter Sutherland of Skaw in Unst was the last speaker), and the local dialect is strongly influenced by Old Norse. In 1774 George Low, a young Scottish clergyman, visited Foula hoping to find remnants of oral literature in Norn, then nearing extinction. He found fragments of songs, ballads and romances, and from his best source, an old farmer called William Henry, the ballad now known as "Hildina". Henry was quite poorly acquainted with the language, so that, although he had as a child memorised all 35 stanzas of the ballad in the original Norn, he could give Low only a summary of its content rather than a translation.  "Hildina" is the only extant poem in Norn.

20th century

Professor Ian Holbourn purchased Foula around 1900, becoming its last laird. He described the disaster of 8 September 1914, when the White Star Line RMS Oceanic hit the Shaalds o' Foula, becoming a wreck within two weeks. Holbourn's remarkable luck with steamship travel held through the following May, when he embarked upon the RMS Lusitania (he survived its sinking).

The professor's grandson, Robert Holbourn, a naval architect, acted as the island's "Peat Marshal" for many years. Peat is a valuable and scarce resource for heat and fuel in Shetland. Its cutting requires skill, taking several years to master. The most able islanders become known as the 'Cutters' and, in the spirit of a long-standing Foula tradition, all able-bodied men are now and then "bid to the banks" of women who "didn't have a cutter in the house".

Simon Martin, who stayed in Foula for five years during his prolonged claim upon the wrecked Oceanic, describes the island as follows: 

A lighthouse at the southern tip of the island was built in 1986. Originally powered by acetylene gas, it has been converted to solar and wind power.

Culture and the arts

Religion
Many inhabitants of Foula attend a Presbyterian parish known as Foula Kirk or Baxter Chapel that is part of the Church of Scotland. It is made of grey-coloured stone and is situated "on the tail of 7 Hamnafield".

Film
Michael Powell's film The Edge of the World (1937) is a dramatisation based on the true story of the evacuation of the last 36 inhabitants of the remote island of St Kilda, on 29 August 1930. Powell was unable to get permission to film in St Kilda. Undaunted, he made the film over four months during the summer of 1936 on Foula, where the islanders speak Shetland dialect.
Return To The Edge Of The World (1978) is a documentary capturing a reunion of the 1937 film's cast and crew, 40 years later, as they revisit the island.

Folklore, festivities, and traditions
Foula's inhabitants preserve many Norse traditions of folklore and festivities. They still follow the Julian calendar for Christmas celebrations, with all the islanders gathering in one house on 6 January though a day out. New Year's Day falls on 13 January.

Poetry
Vagaland's poem "Da Sang o da Papa men" about the fishermen of Papa Stour includes an insistent chorus chant, "Rowin Foula Doon". This refers to the fishermen's practice of rowing their open fishing boat out to sea until the high cliffs of Foula were no longer visible.

Geodesy
The Sneug in Foula was the origin (meridian) of the 6 inch and 1:2500 Ordnance Survey maps of Orkney and Shetland.

Notable residents 
Martin Ferguson Smith (b. 1940), scholar and writer.
Sheila Gear, author of Foula, Island West of the Sun (published 1983 by Robert Hale Limited).  She was born in Oxford and studied zoology at Aberdeen University.  She married Jim Gear, a crofter, and wrote a book about crofter life in Shetland.

See also

 List of lighthouses in Scotland
 List of Northern Lighthouse Board lighthouses
 Fair Isle

References

Further reading

External links

 Foula Heritage
 Northern Lighthouse Board 
 Picture of Foula Lighthouse
 Foula: Britain's most remote inhabited island

 
Islands of Shetland
Sites of Special Scientific Interest in Shetland
Nature Conservation Review sites
Norn language
Birdwatching sites in Scotland
Underwater diving sites in Scotland